The following list is for the MTV Movie Award winners and nominees for Best Kiss. Kristen Stewart & Robert Pattinson won for "The Twilight Saga films" (along with "Best Movie") in four consecutive years (2009–2012).

Winners and nominees

Awards breakdown

Most Wins 
 Robert Pattinson — 4

 Kristen Stewart — 4

Most Nominations 
 Kristen Stewart — 6
 Robert Pattinson — 5
 Emma Watson — 4
 Cameron Diaz — 3
 Leonardo DiCaprio — 3
 James Franco — 3
 Ryan Gosling — 3
 Woody Harrelson — 3
 Jennifer Lawrence — 3
 Gwyneth Paltrow — 3
 Keanu Reeves — 3
 Winona Ryder — 3
 Emma Stone — 3
 Amy Adams — 2
 Ben Affleck — 2
 Jennifer Aniston — 2
 Drew Barrymore — 2
 Sandra Bullock — 2
 Jim Carrey — 2
 Lily Collins — 2
 Zac Efron — 2
 Anna Faris — 2
 Jennifer Garner — 2
 Joseph Gordon-Levitt — 2
 Tom Hanks — 2
 Ethan Hawke — 2
 Taraji P. Henson — 2
 Terrence Howard — 2
 Vanessa Hudgens — 2
 Scarlett Johansson — 2
 Angelina Jolie — 2
 Mila Kunis — 2
 Taylor Lautner — 2
 Jude Law — 2
 Heath Ledger — 2
 Juliette Lewis — 2
 Rachel McAdams — 2
 Elliot Page — 2
 Natalie Portman — 2
 Daniel Radcliffe — 2
 Ryan Reynolds — 2
 Zoe Saldana — 2
 Adam Sandler — 2
 Christian Slater — 2
 Will Smith — 2
 Mark Wahlberg — 2
 Shailene Woodley — 2

Notes

References

MTV Movie & TV Awards
Kissing